Santucci is a surname. Notable people with the surname include:

 Angelo Santucci (born 1952), Canadian Football League player
 Antonio Santucci (died 1613), Italian astronomer, cosmographer, and scientific instrument maker
 Antonio Santucci (bishop) (1928–2018), Italian Roman Catholic bishop
 Barbara Santucci (born 1947), American artist, poet and author
 Clara Santucci (born 1987), American long-distance runner
 Dan Santucci (born 1983), American football player
 Facundo Santucci (born 1987), Argentine male volleyball player
 Graziano Santucci (died 1517), Italian Roman Catholic Bishop of Alatri
 John J. Santucci (1931–2016), New York politician, D.A. of Queens County
 Lavinia Santucci (born 1985), Italian female basketball player
 Michele Santucci (born 1989), Italian Olympic swimmer
 Pat Santucci (1924–1992), Canadian football player
 Roberto Santucci (born 1967), Brazilian filmmaker
 Serge Santucci (born 1944), French sculptor and medallist
 Vincenzo Santucci (1796–1861), Italian Roman Catholic cardinal

See also
 Mariam Habach Santucci (born 1996), Miss Venezuela 2015
 Palazzo Santucci, Renaissance palace

Italian-language surnames